The shidduch crisis is a commonly observed and discussed phenomenon in the Orthodox Jewish community whereby eligible single persons, especially women or Sephardim, have difficulty finding a suitable spouse, or a shidduch. Debate exists as to whether the crisis actually exists or is a new phenomenon.

Causes and solutions 
Several causes have been cited for the shidduch crisis, but it is most commonly attributed to the average age gap between Orthodox Jewish women and men at which they get married. However, this is widely disputed. Several initiatives in various Orthodox Jewish communities exist which try to close the age gap by offering rewards for shadchanim who set up men with women of the same age or older.

Other causes cited include the increased scrutiny placed on eligible women and the shidduch system in general.

Pandemic revolution of online shidduch 
During the pandemic of COVID-19, prolonged lockdown, and popularisation of mobile apps and online video calls, in-person dating and meeting new people became challenging. In these circumstances, the internet-based shidduch regained its popularity not only among the Orthodox Jews, but also among the non-religious Jews. This new dynamic has been proclaimed "the Shidduch Revolution".

See also 
 Jewish view of marriage
 Matchmaking
 Shidduch
 Shadchan (matchmaker)
 Role of women in Judaism

References 

Intimate relationships
Jewish marital law
Dating
Matchmaking
Jewish life cycle
Orthodox Judaism